of Rome is a 1981 gay pornographic film made during the Golden Age of Porn, directed by John Christopher, starring George Payne and Scorpio. The film was notable as the most expensive gay porno at the time of its release, financed by George Bosque, later convicted of stealing almost $2 million.

Plot
Demetrius and Octavius are Roman countrymen sold into slavery for not paying their taxes during Emperor Caligula's reign. Demetrius is purchased by the Emperor and taught to be a "good slave" by Argus while Octavius is claimed by a sadistic commander. The commander wants the bound Demetrius but is refused. Octavius sneaks in while the guards are asleep and frees Demetrius.

Cast
 George Payne as Demetrius
 David Hadkey as Old Slave
 Giuseppe Welch as Bath Slave
 Scorpio as Octavius
 Roy Garrett as Senator
 John Kovacs as Senator
 Michael Flent as The Emperor
 Ed Wiley as Argus
 Eric Ryan as Sadistic Commander
 Ryder Jones as Bath Slave
 Adam De Haven as Claudius

Behind the scenes
Claiming to be one of the most expensive gay films of its time (nearly $100,000 to produce), Centurians of Rome was purportedly financed from the 1980 theft of almost $2 million by a Brink's security guard. Lloyd's of London, an insurer of Brinks, initially filed claim to partial ownership of the film.

References

External links
 Official Studio Site, Bijou Video
 

1981 films
Gay pornographic films
1980s pornographic films
Films set in the Roman Empire
1980s English-language films